Tripartite motif-containing protein 15 is a protein that in humans is encoded by the TRIM15 gene.

The protein encoded by this gene is a member of the tripartite motif (TRIM) family. The TRIM motif includes three zinc-binding domains, a RING, a B-box type 1 and a B-box type 2, and a coiled-coil region. The protein localizes to the cytoplasm. Its function has not been identified. Alternate splicing of this gene results in two transcript variants encoding different isoforms.

References

Further reading